Dambrauskas is a Lithuanian surname. Notable people with the surname include:

Paulius Dambrauskas (born 1991), Lithuanian basketball player
Valdas Dambrauskas (born 1977), Lithuanian football manager
Virginijus Dambrauskas (born 1962), Lithuanian chess master

Lithuanian-language surnames